Jay is a hamlet in north Herefordshire, England.

The lane between Jay and Leintwardine is called Jay Lane and the bridge over the Clun is Jay Bridge. The minor River Redlake passes Jay and then joins the Clun just south of Jay Bridge.

The hamlets of Jay and nearby Heath formed a single township and whilst in the present day form part of the civil parish of Leintwardine, and thus a part of Herefordshire, they were regarded as being part of Shropshire until the mid-19th century.

A Roman auxiliary cavalry fort was situated at Jay Lane.

A relative of this family, Brian de Jay, was the last recorded master of the English Knights Templar.

To the north is the hamlet of Broadward (in Shropshire), to the west is the small village of Bedstone (in Shropshire), and to the south is the hamlet of Buckton (in Herefordshire).

References

Hamlets in Herefordshire
Places formerly in Shropshire